Satish Hiremath (born 1963 in Easton, Pennsylvania) is an American politician who was the Mayor of Oro Valley, Arizona. He is a practicing dentist and one of the oldest practitioners of dentistry in Oro Valley. Hiremath is an American citizen of ethnic Indian origin.  Hiremath is only the second Mayor of East Indian descent in the United States.

References

Living people
Mayors of places in Arizona
1969 births
University of Michigan alumni
American mayors of Indian descent
American politicians of Indian descent
Asian-American people in Arizona politics
Howard University alumni
American dentists